Oripää is a municipality of Finland.

It is located in the Southwest Finland region.

The municipality is unilingually Finnish.

History 
Oripää is named after a nearby hill, Orivuori (literally the "stallion mountain"), which may also have been called Oripää ("stallion head") at some point. As a village, Oripää is first mentioned in 1421. It was a part of the Pöytyä parish, but administratively a part of the Kumogård castle fief (linnalääni/slottslän), i.e. Satakunta. In the 15th century, the bishop of Turku had five leasehold farms in the village.

Oripää gained chapel rights in 1778 and became an independent parish in 1901.

References

External links

Municipality of Oripää – Official website